This is a list of defunct airlines of Kazakhstan.

See also
 List of airlines of Kazakhstan
 List of airports in Kazakhstan

References

Kazakhstan
Airlines
Airlines, defunct